Darmody is an unincorporated community in Eyebrow Rural Municipality No. 193, Saskatchewan, Canada. It previously held the status of a village until December 31, 1967.

See also

List of communities in Saskatchewan

References

Eyebrow No. 193, Saskatchewan
Former villages in Saskatchewan
Unincorporated communities in Saskatchewan